Dongbu Park is a metro station on the Loop Line of Chongqing Rail Transit in Yubei District of Chongqing Municipality, China.

The station serves the park in which its name derived from Dongbu Park and its surrounding area, including nearby office buildings and residential blocks.

The station opened on 28 December 2018.

Station Structure

Loop Line Platform
Platform Layout
An island platform is used for Loop Line trains travelling in both directions.

Exits
There are a total of 4 entrances/exits for the station.

Surroundings

Nearby Places
Dongbu Park
Longfor Crystal City
Xing Guang School

Nearby Stations
Honghudonglu station (a Loop Line station)
Ranjiaba station (a Loop Line, Line 5 & Line 6 station)

See also
Chongqing Rail Transit (CRT)
Loop Line (CRT)

References

Railway stations in Chongqing
Railway stations in China opened in 2018
Chongqing Rail Transit stations